VF Corporation (formerly Vanity Fair Mills until 1969) is an American global apparel and footwear company founded in 1899 by John Barbey and headquartered in Denver, Colorado. The company's 13 brands are organized into three categories: Outdoor, Active and Work. The company controls 55% of the U.S. backpack market with the JanSport, Eastpak, Timberland, and The North Face brands.

History
In October 1899, John Barbey and a group of investors established the company as Reading Glove and Mitten Manufacturing Company (or simply The Reading Glove) in Reading, Pennsylvania. Incorporated on December 4 later that year, they began with $11,000 in a  factory that was leased for $60/month.

Expanding into silk lingerie in 1913, The Reading Glove was renamed Schuylkill Silk Manufacturing, branding its lingerie line as Vanity Fair. Soon thereafter, the company name changed in turn to Vanity Fair Mills, eventually going public in 1951.

In 1969, the H.D. Lee Company (now Lee) was acquired, accompanied by Vanity Fair Mills changing to VF Corporation. By 1982 VF posted profits of $15.5 million on sales of $184 million. Acquiring Blue Bell Inc. for US$762 million in 1986, VF added Wrangler, JanSport, Rustler, Jantzen, and Red Kap to its portfolio, effectively doubling its size and making it the largest publicly-held clothing company. VF would also become one of the two largest jeans makers in the world, making up 25% of the market.

In 1998, VF moved its headquarters from Wyomissing, Pennsylvania to Greensboro, North Carolina to be closer to more of its operations. Also in the 1990s, VF would acquire the Bulwark Apparel brand.

In the early 2000s, VF's acquisitions included The North Face and Eastpak in 2000; and Kipling, Napapijri, and Vans in 2004. The company sold its 'Vanity Fair Intimates' lingerie business to Fruit of the Loom for US$350 million in cash on 23 January 2007. Later that month, VF acquired Eagle Creek. Also in 2007, VF acquired Majestic Athletic on February 28, followed by a $885-million purchase of 7 for all Mankind and Lucy Activewear on July 26.

Eric C. Wiseman became President, CEO, and Chairman in 2008, the same year that VF would acquire Mo Industries Holdings, parent company of sportswear brands Splendid and Ella Moss.

In 2011, VF Corporation announced its intention to purchase Timberland for $2.2 billion, a deal that would close in September that year. On 21 December 2012, VF Imagewear was awarded a multimillion-dollar contract to provide uniforms and insignia for U.S. Customs and Border Protection officers. In February 2013, Imagewear was awarded a $50 million contract to manufacture uniforms for Transportation Security Administration officers.

Effective 1 January 2017 Steve Rendle took over CEO and President responsibilities. In 2017, VF acquired Williamson-Dickie’s brands, including Dickies, Workrite, Kodiak, Terra, and Walls. The next year, VF would acquire Icebreaker, complementing its Smartwool brand, as both feature Merino wool in its clothing and accessories. In 2020, VF acquired streetwear brand Supreme for US$2.1 billion.

In 2021, VF announced a definitive agreement to sell a portion of its occupational Work segment to a subsidiary of Redwood Capital Investments, LLC. On June 28, 2021, the sale was finalized, and the 11 divested brands became part of a new standalone company, Workwear Outfitters.

In September 2021, it was announced that the former president of emerging brands of VF Corporation Travis Campbell will acquire the Eagle Creek brand. The sale includes all Eagle Creek assets and liabilities. It does not include any Eagle Creek or VF associates.

Spinoff
In August 2018, it was announced that VF would be splitting into two separate companies. The jeans and outlet stores would be spun off as Kontoor Brands. VF kept the sports apparel and footwear businesses, and moved its corporate headquarters (and around 800 employees) to Denver, Colorado.  An 11-story office building at 1551 Wewatta Street near Denver Union Station would become VF's new corporate headquarters. All brands which until 2018 had maintained separate divisional headquarters (e.g., Jansport) were also consolidated into VF's new Denver headquarters at that point in time.

Kontoor Brands Inc. became a separate company with the stock symbol KTB in May 2019. Kontoor includes Lee, Wrangler, Rock & Republic and VF Outlets. The company had 17,000 employees, 600 at the headquarters, at 400 North Elm Street in Greensboro, and merchandising, design, product development and innovation at Revolution Mill. A support center is located on South Elm-Eugene Street. Lee moved to Elm Street from Merriam, Kansas. CEO Scott Baxter said the name Kontoor referred to the "contour" of the body, but the original spelling could not be used.

Brands

Current brands

Workwear
 Dickies (2017)

Outdoor and action sports
Date of acquisition or merger in parenthesis.

 Altra (2018)
 Eastpak (2000)
 Icebreaker (2018)
 And1 Lab (1999)
 JanSport (1986)
 Kipling (2004)
 The North Face (2000)
 Napapijri (2004)
 SmartWool (2011)
 Supreme (2020)
 Timberland (2011)
 Vans (2004)

Divested brands
 Vanity Fair lingerie (sold in 2007 to Fruit of the Loom)
 7 for All Mankind (sold in 2016 to Delta Galil Industries)
 Splendid (sold in 2016 to Delta Galil Industries)
 Eagle Creek (sold in 2021 to former president of emerging brands of VF Corp. Travis Campbell).
 Ella Moss (sold in 2016 to Delta Galil Industries)
 Majestic Athletic (sold in 2017 to Fanatics)
 Nautica (sold in 2018 to Authentic Brands Group)
 Bulwark Protective Apparel (sold in 2021 to Redwood Capital Investments, LLC; became part of Workwear Outfitters)
 Chef Designs (sold in 2021 to Redwood Capital Investments, LLC; became part of Workwear Outfitters)
 Horace Small (a clothing company—founded in 1937 and based in Nashville, Tennessee—that produced uniforms for law enforcement, fire, EMS, security and land management services. In 1999, the company was acquired by VF Corporation, and was renamed as The Force in 2005, but reverted to the original brand name in 2010.) In 2021, the Horace Small brand was sold to Redwood Capital Investments, LLC; and later became part of Workwear Outfitters.
 Kodiak (sold in 2021 to Redwood Capital Investments, LLC; became part of Workwear Outfitters)
 Liberty (sold in 2021 to Redwood Capital Investments, LLC; became part of Workwear Outfitters)
 Red Kap (sold in 2021 to Redwood Capital Investments, LLC; became part of Workwear Outfitters)
 Terra (sold in 2021 to Redwood Capital Investments, LLC; became part of Workwear Outfitters)
 VF Solutions (sold in 2021 to Redwood Capital Investments, LLC; became part of Workwear Outfitters and renamed Image Authority)
 Walls (sold in 2021 to Redwood Capital Investments, LLC; became part of Workwear Outfitters)
 Work Authority (sold in 2021 to Redwood Capital Investments, LLC; became part of Workwear Outfitters)
 Workrite Fire Service (sold in 2021 to Redwood Capital Investments, LLC; became part of Workwear Outfitters)

VF Outlet, Inc.

In 1970, it was the suggestion of M.O. Lee, then President of VF Corporation, that established the VF Outlet business. Surplus products from VF sources including Berkshire International and Vanity Fair were sold to the public from a 5,000 square foot factory store, with only a drop cloth separating it from the company's manufacturing facility. In doing so, VF Corporation created a brand-new retail industry, the outlet mall. The first VF Outlet factory store opened in Reading, Pennsylvania. The outlet mall, located in Vanity Fair's old manufacturing mills, was dubbed the official "Outlet Capital of the World." The corporate name was changed from VF Outlet Village to VF Outlet Center in 2008. Today, the VF Outlet Center is owned and operated by VF Outlet, Inc. with over 1,000,000 square feet of retail space and more than 20 stores. The VF Outlet location in Reading, Pennsylvania closed on December 24, 2020.

VF Outlet stores offer everyday apparel including brand name jeans, intimate apparel, activewear, swimwear, and more for women, men and children. The company currently operates 79 stores in 31 states nationwide.

In October 2013, VF Outlet launched their e-commerce store.

The VF Outlet business moved to Kontoor Brands Inc, established as a separate company in May 2019.

References

External links
 
Workwear Outfitters website: www.wwof.com
 

 
Companies based in Berks County, Pennsylvania
Companies based in Greensboro, North Carolina
Manufacturing companies based in Denver
Clothing companies of the United States
Companies listed on the New York Stock Exchange
American companies established in 1899
1899 establishments in Pennsylvania
Multinational companies headquartered in the United States